Chorthippus vagans, which may be called the heath grasshopper or steppe grasshopper, is a species of grasshopper belonging to the subfamily Gomphocerinae. It is found across the Palearctic through Russia and Kazakhstan, east to Siberia, and north to Denmark.  It is rare in the British Isles.

The steppe grasshopper lives in warm and dry habitats with sparse, low vegetation.

References

vagans
Orthoptera of Europe
Insects described in 1848